Wiley Sparkman (January 5, 1906 – February 23, 1995) was an American politician.

A native of Springdale, Arkansas, born in 1906, Sparkman moved to Grove, Oklahoma, at the age of twelve. He was first elected to the Oklahoma House of Representatives from Delaware County in 1952. After a single term, Sparkman was succeeded by Carl Thomas Mustain. Sparkman returned to office in 1957, and served until his April 1982 resignation. In 1965, Sparkman's constituency expanded to cover a portion of Adair County, and was enumerated district 5. In his final term, district 5 was redrawn, and consisted of Delaware County, Mayes County, and Ottawa County.

Sparkman died on February 23, 1995, aged 89.

References

1906 births
1995 deaths
People from Springdale, Arkansas
Democratic Party members of the Oklahoma House of Representatives
People from Grove, Oklahoma
20th-century American politicians